The Shreveport Opera is an opera company in the city of Shreveport, Louisiana, United States. The opera performs at the RiverView Theater with its offices located at 6969 Fern Loop, suite 206 The opera began in the late 1940s and has continued until the present day. It is the second largest of four opera companies in the state. In the 1960s, many famous singers appeared in Shreveport including Placido Domingo, Lucine Amara,
Teresa Stratas, and Beverly Sills.

References

American opera companies
Culture of Shreveport, Louisiana
Tourist attractions in Shreveport, Louisiana
Musical groups established in 1949
Performing arts in Louisiana
1949 establishments in Louisiana